The 2000–01 Penn State Nittany Lions basketball team represented Pennsylvania State University in the 2000–01 NCAA Division I men's basketball season. They were led by head coach Jerry Dunn, in his sixth season with the team, and played their home games at the Bryce Jordan Center in University Park, Pennsylvania as members of the Big Ten Conference. The Lions finished the season 21–12, 7–9 in Big Ten play to finish in a two-way tie for 6th place. They defeated Michigan and Michigan State before losing to Iowa in the semifinals of the Big Ten tournament. They received a bid to the 2001 NCAA Division I men's basketball tournament where they defeated Providence and North Carolina before losing to Temple in the Sweet 16.

Roster

Schedule

|-
!colspan=9 style=| Big Ten tournament

|-
!colspan=9 style=| 2001 NCAA tournament

References

Penn State Nittany Lions basketball seasons
Penn State
Penn State
Penn State
Penn State